Prochoerodes olivata is a species of geometrid moth in the family Geometridae. It is found in Central America and North America.

The MONA or Hodges number for Prochoerodes olivata is 6983.

References

Further reading

 

Ourapterygini
Articles created by Qbugbot
Moths described in 1904